Rafael García Tinajero Pérez (born 19 February 1960) is a Mexican politician affiliated to the Party of the Democratic Revolution. As of 2014 he served as Deputy of the LIX Legislature of the Mexican Congress representing Michoacán.

References

1960 births
Living people
Politicians from Michoacán
Party of the Democratic Revolution politicians
Universidad Michoacana de San Nicolás de Hidalgo alumni
Deputies of the LIX Legislature of Mexico
Members of the Chamber of Deputies (Mexico) for Michoacán